Ricardo Teixeira (born 2 August 1984 in Lisbon, Portugal) is an Angolan-Portuguese racing driver. He holds dual nationality and has raced under both nationalities at various points in his career. He was the first Angolan driver to drive a Formula 1 car when he was announced as a test driver for Team Lotus for 2011. He has been sponsored throughout his career by the Angolan oil company Sonangol.

Career

Formula BMW
Teixeira began his formula racing career in 2001 by driving in the Formula BMW Junior Cup in Portugal. He finished in 20th position in the drivers' championship.

Formula Three
Teixeira moved to the National Class of the British Formula 3 Championship in 2002, but did not start a race that year. In 2003 he raced occasionally in the BRSCC's ARP Formula Three Championship, taking one win and three podiums finish at club racing level.

He returned to the British Championship in 2005 after taking a couple of years out for study with the Carlin Motorsport team, finishing ninth in the National Class. The following season, he improved to seventh, despite switching teams to Performance Racing Europe part-way through the year finishing twice in the podium. In 2007, he moved up to the Championship Class of the series with Performance Racing, scoring no points. For 2008, he moved to the Ultimate Motorsport team's Mygale chassis.
Teixeira also competed in two races of the German ATS Formel 3 Cup in 2007, and has driven in two Masters of Formula Three races, with a best finish of 24th.

GP2 Series
Teixeira was signed by the Trident Racing team to drive in the fifth and sixth rounds of the 2008–09 GP2 Asia Series season. He replaced Frankie Provenzano, and was the seventh competitor to drive one of the team's two entries. He was the first Angolan driver to compete at this level of motorsport. Trident kept a hold of Teixeira for the 2009 GP2 Series.

After two years away from the series, one in FIA Formula Two Championship and then as a test driver for the Lotus Formula One team, Teixeira returned to GP2 by signing with the Rapax team for the 2012 season, in which he partnered Tom Dillmann. After ten races, and with a best finish of 13th, he was replaced by Daniël de Jong after suffering from illness. He returned to action for the next round at Silverstone, with De Jong taking Dillmann's seat instead. Teixeira eventually finished 29th in the championship.

FIA Formula Two Championship

Teixeira moved to the FIA Formula Two Championship for 2010. He finished fifth in his third race in the series, at Marrakech, but suffered a spectacular aerial accident in the following race when he collided with Ivan Samarin under braking for a chicane. Teixeira was uninjured in the accident. Over the course of the season he amassed 23 points to finish 16th in the drivers' championship: his best showing in any series since 2006.

Formula One
After driving for Team Lotus in pre-season testing for the 2011 season, Teixeira was confirmed as a test driver for the team in March 2011.

GP2 again
In July 2013, Ricardo Teixeira returned to the GP2 series in Hungary with the Trident team.

Racing record

Career summary

Complete GP2 Series results
(key) (Races in bold indicate pole position) (Races in italics indicate fastest lap)

Complete GP2 Asia Series results
(key) (Races in bold indicate pole position) (Races in italics indicate fastest lap)

Complete FIA Formula Two Championship results
(key) (Races in bold indicate pole position) (Races in italics indicate fastest lap)

Complete Auto GP results
(key) (Races in bold indicate pole position) (Races in italics indicate fastest lap)

References

External links

Ricardo Teixeira career details at driverdb.com 
British F3 driver profile

1984 births
Living people
Sportspeople from Lisbon
Angolan racing drivers
Portuguese racing drivers
British Formula Three Championship drivers
German Formula Three Championship drivers
GP2 Series drivers
GP2 Asia Series drivers
FIA Formula Two Championship drivers
Auto GP drivers
Carlin racing drivers
Performance Racing drivers
Trident Racing drivers
Rapax Team drivers
Super Nova Racing drivers
Portuguese people of Angolan descent